The canton of Tiercé is an administrative division of the Maine-et-Loire department, in western France. Its borders were modified at the French canton reorganisation which came into effect in March 2015. Its seat is in Tiercé.

It consists of the following communes:

Baracé 
Chambellay
Cheffes
Chenillé-Champteussé
Durtal
Erdre-en-Anjou (partly)
Étriché
Grez-Neuville
Les Hauts-d'Anjou
La Jaille-Yvon
Juvardeil
Le Lion-d'Angers
Longuenée-en-Anjou (partly)
Miré
Montigné-lès-Rairies
Montreuil-sur-Maine
Morannes sur Sarthe-Daumeray
Les Rairies
Sceaux-d'Anjou
Thorigné-d'Anjou
Tiercé

References

Cantons of Maine-et-Loire